A Few Best Men is a 2011 comedy film written by Dean Craig and directed by Stephan Elliott. The film stars Xavier Samuel as a young groom heading to the Australian Blue Mountains with his three best men for his wedding. A sequel, A Few Less Men, was released in 2017.

Plot
When David Locking proposes to his girlfriend Mia Ramme a week after they meet in Tuvalu, he rounds up his three best friends to attend his wedding in Australia as best men; however, all hell breaks loose when the three of them accidentally steal drugs, are chased by a mobster, and get the father-in-law's sheep stoned.

Cast
 Xavier Samuel as David Locking
 Kris Marshall as Tom
 Kevin Bishop as Graham
 Rebel Wilson as Daphne Ramme
 Olivia Newton-John as Barbara Ramme
 Laura Brent as Mia Ramme
 Jonathan Biggins as Jim Ramme
 Tim Draxl as Luke
 Steve Le Marquand as Ray
 Elizabeth Debicki as Maureen

Music

Universal Music Australia released A Few Best Man: Original Motion Picture Soundtrack and Remixes on 20 January 2012. The film soundtrack is sung primarily by Olivia Newton-John.

Release
A Few Best Men premiered at the Mill Valley Film Festival in San Rafael, California on 14 October 2011. The film was released in Australia on 26 January 2012, and in the United Kingdom on 31 August 2012.

Critical reception
A Few Best Men was met with negative reviews, earning an approval rating of 18% on Rotten Tomatoes, based on 39 reviews, with an average score of 3.6/10.

Fiona Williams of SBS noted that the film was as "funny as a funeral", awarding one star out of five, commenting that "Like a bad wedding reception, A Few Best Men is overlong by at least an hour, and the flimsy plot groans under its own weight."

Despite poor reviews, A Few Best Men was nominated for an AACTA Award for Best Original Music Score.

References

External links

 
 

2011 films
2011 comedy films
2011 independent films
Australian comedy films
Australian independent films
British comedy films
British independent films
Films about weddings
Films directed by Stephan Elliott
Films set in Australia
Films set in England
Films shot in Australia
Films scored by Guy Gross
Icon Productions films
Screen Australia films
2010s English-language films
2010s British films